Nothing on TV is the debut album by Australian band Cassette Kids.

Track listing
"Insomnia" - 4:04
"Spin" - 3:36
"Lying Around" - 3:25
"Coming Back" - 3:44
"Big Jerk" - 4:22
"Freaky Sweetie" - 3:34
"Game Player" - 3:34
"You Shot Me" - 3:43
"Nothing on TV" - 3:29
"Wherever You Are" - 3:57
"Hey Baby" - 3:34
"Fatal Attraction" - 3:41
"Outro" - 1:40
"By the Roadside" - 3:17

References

2010 debut albums